, also known by his nickname Pika, is a professional footballer who plays as a winger for Thai League 2 club Uthai Thani and the Philippines national team.

Early life and education
Minegishi was born on June 5, 1991. His Filipino mother is a native of Olongapo while his father is Japanese. He studied at the Seiwa Gakuen High School for his secondary studies and later attended the Sendai University for his collegiate studies.

Club career

Youth
Minegishi was part of the youth system of the Urawa Red Diamonds. He also played as part of the football team of Sendai University.

Senior

Global Cebu
Fellow Filipino-Japanese, Daisuke Sato invited Minegishi to play club football in the Philippines.  In early 2015, Global F.C. of the United Football League had signed Minegishi.  Minegishi scored 17 goals in 17 league matches for Global in the 2016 UFL season reportedly by October 5, 2016. He was awarded the Golden Ball at the end of the season. Minegishi ended his stint with Global Cebu with a runner-up finish at the inaugural season of the Philippine Football League in 2017.

Pattaya United
He moved to Pattaya United F.C. and will form part of the club starting in the 2018 Thai League 1 season.

International career

Philippines
By November 5, 2016, Minegishi was processing his Philippine passport for him to be eligible to play for the Philippines national football team.

Minegishi made his debut for the Philippines in their first group stage match against Singapore, coming on as a half-time substitute.  The match ended in a 0–0 draw. In the next group stage match where the Philippines settled for a 2–2 draw with Indonesia, Minegishi made his first international start.

On 22 March 2018, Minegishi scored his debut international goal for the Philippines, scoring the Azkals' second goal in a 3-2 friendly win over Fiji.

International goals
Scores and results list the Philippines' goal tally first.

References

1991 births
Living people
Filipino footballers
Philippines international footballers
Citizens of the Philippines through descent
Japanese people of Filipino descent
Filipino people of Japanese descent
Sendai University alumni
Association football midfielders
Sportspeople from Sendai
Expatriate footballers in Thailand
Hikaru Minegishi
Global Makati F.C. players
Hikaru Minegishi
Hikaru Minegishi
Ceres–Negros F.C. players